Self-healing juvenile cutaneous mucinosis is a skin condition caused by fibroblasts producing abnormally large amounts of mucopolysaccharides, and is characterized by the sudden onset of skin lesions and polyarthritis.

See also 
 Lichen myxedematosus
 Skin lesion

References

External links 

Mucinoses